is a Japanese long-distance runner. She competed in the 5000 metres at the 2015 World Championships in Beijing finishing ninth. In addition, she won two medals at the 2013 Summer Universiade.

International competitions

References

External links

 

1991 births
Living people
People from Toyohashi
Sportspeople from Aichi Prefecture
Japanese female long-distance runners
Olympic athletes of Japan
Athletes (track and field) at the 2016 Summer Olympics
Olympic female marathon runners
Universiade medalists in athletics (track and field)
Universiade gold medalists for Japan
Universiade silver medalists for Japan
Medalists at the 2013 Summer Universiade
World Athletics Championships athletes for Japan
Japan Championships in Athletics winners
Athletes (track and field) at the 2020 Summer Olympics
20th-century Japanese women
21st-century Japanese women